The 2008 AFC Women's Asian Cup was played in Vietnam from 28 May to 8 June 2008. It was won by North Korea.

Qualification

Seedings
The draw was held on 18 April 2008 in Ho Chi Minh City, Vietnam.

 1. 
 2. 
 3. 
 4. 
 5. 
 6. 
 7. 
 8.  (host nation)

Venues
The tournament was held entirely in the following two venues. Both are in Ho Chi Minh City.
 Thống Nhất Stadium
 Army Stadium

Group stage
All times UTC+7

Group A

Group B

Knockout stage
All times UTC+7

Semi-final

Third place match

Final

Awards

Goalscorers

Tournament teams ranking

References

External links
 RSSSF.com

 
2008
Women
2008 in Vietnamese football
2008
Afc
2008 in Japanese women's football
2008 in North Korean football
2008 in Chinese football
2007–08 in Australian women's soccer
2008 in Thai football
2008 in Taiwanese football
2008 in South Korean football
May 2008 sports events in Asia
June 2008 sports events in Asia